Benarkabud or Benar Kabud may refer to:
Benar Kabud, Khorramabad
Benarkabud-e Do, Dowreh County
Benarkabud-e Seh, Dowreh County
Benarkabud-e Yek, Dowreh County